Ceropegia decidua is a species of plant in the family Apocynaceae. It is found in South Africa and Eswatini.

References

decidua
Least concern plants
Taxonomy articles created by Polbot